Oxalyl fluoride is the organofluorine compound with the formula (COF)2.  It is a fluorinated derivative of oxalic acid. This colorless liquid is prepared by reaction of sodium fluoride with oxalyl chloride.

Oxalyl fluoride is being investigated for use in etching as a replacement for compounds which have the liability of high global warming potential.

See also
 Oxalyl chloride
 Oxalyl bromide
 Dioxane tetraketone
 Oxalyl

References

Acyl fluorides
Inorganic carbon compounds
Carbon oxohalides